Varetz ( or) is a commune in the Corrèze department in central France.

It lies in the urban area of Brive-la-Gaillarde between Objat and Brive-la-Gaillarde at the confluence of the Vézère and the Correze. Varetz station and Le Burg station have rail connections to Brive-la-Gaillarde, Saint-Yrieix and Limoges.

Population

See also
Communes of the Corrèze department

References

Communes of Corrèze
Corrèze communes articles needing translation from French Wikipedia